Sahurs is a commune in the Seine-Maritime department in the Normandy region in northern France.

Geography
A car ferry connects the commune with the south bank.

Population

Places of interest
 The church of St. Sauveur, dating from the eleventh century.
 The sixteenth century Château de Soquence.
 The manorhouse and chapel de Marbeuf, dating from the sixteenth century.
 The Château de Trémauville.

Notable people
 Louis de Brézé, who built the Manoir de Marbeuf.
 Pierre de Marbeuf, 17th-century French poet, lived in the manor.
 Anne of Austria was a benefactor of the chapel de Marbeuf.

See also
Communes of the Seine-Maritime department

References

Communes of Seine-Maritime